Norman Leslie Munro (1842–1894) was a Canadian-American publisher. 

In 1873 Munro established the New York Family Story Paper, which gained a weekly circulation of 325,000. He also published Boys of New York, Our Boys, Munro's Library, and the American juvenile magazine Golden Hours in the late 19th century. One of his main writers was H. Irving Hancock.

Throughout his life, Munro owned several fast steam yachts including the Herreshoff-designed Norwood, which garnered extensive media attention for its competition with William Randolph Hearst's rival yacht Vamoose to set speed new records.

Munro died on February 24, 1894, in New York City after an appendectomy and was survived by his wife and two children.  He is buried in Green-Wood Cemetery.

References

External links

 Norman L. Munro (publisher) at the Internet Speculative Fiction Database

American publishers (people)
1842 births
1894 deaths
19th-century American businesspeople
Former yacht owners of New York City